Tilak Nagar may refer to the following places in India:

 Tilak Nagar (Mumbai)
Tilak Nagar railway station
 Tilak Nagar (Delhi)
Tilak Nagar metro station
 Tilaknagar, Hyderabad